The U.S. Department of Energy has determined that West Virginia has significant wind power development opportunities, with a potential of 69 gigawatts. As of the start of 2020, there were 376 wind turbines in operation in West Virginia with a generating capacity of 686 megawatts (MW) and responsible for 2.7% of in-state electricity production. An additional 56 MW was under construction.

The state, a major coal producer, passed renewable portfolio standard legislation in 2009, but repealed it in 2015.

Statistics 

Source:

List of wind farms
Beech Ridge Wind Farm
Mount Storm Wind Farm - The 264-megawatt wind farm in Grant County consists of 132 turbines along 12 miles of the Allegheny Front.
Mountaineer Wind Energy Center

See also

Solar power in West Virginia
Wind power in the United States
Renewable energy in the United States

References

External links